Very, Very Powerful Motor is the second studio album by the Fastbacks, released in 1990 on PopLlama Records.

The second track, "Apologies," is a cover of a Pointed Sticks song.

Critical reception
Trouser Press wrote that the album "gives Bloch’s pop-rooted songs rocking arrangements that occasionally overwhelm them." Greil Marcus, in Artforum, called it "unreconstructed punk with a lot of melody, no apologies ... and Kim Warnick, for whom singing flat is just a form a realism."

Track listing
All songs written by Kurt Bloch, except where noted.
 "In the Summer" – 3:23
 "Apologies" (Nick Jones) – 1:50
 "Trouble Sleeping" – 3:18
 "Better Than Before" – 3:25
 "What to Expect Dirk's Car Jam" – 5:02
 "Says Who?" – 4:12
 "Last Night I Had a Dream That I Could Fly" – 5:13
 "I Won't Regret" – 3:25
 "I Guess" – 2:41
 "Always Tomorrow" – 4:25
 "I'll Be Okay" – 5:00
 "Everything I Don't Need" – 3:22

Personnel
Kim Warnick – vocals, bass
Kurt Bloch – guitar
Lulu Gargiulo – guitar
Nate Johnson – drums

References

1990 albums
Fastbacks albums
PopLlama Records albums